Clemon Rooney (August 13, 1911 – March 1980) was an American Negro league pitcher in the 1940s.

A native of Arkansas, Rooney played for the St. Louis–New Orleans Stars in 1941. He died in Minneapolis, Minnesota in 1980 at age 68.

References

External links
 and Seamheads 
 Clemon Rooney at Arkansas Baseball Encyclopedia

1911 births
1980 deaths
Place of birth missing
Date of death missing
St. Louis–New Orleans Stars players
Baseball pitchers
Baseball players from Arkansas
20th-century African-American sportspeople